The Charleston is a dance named after the harbor city of Charleston, South Carolina. The rhythm was popularized in mainstream dance music in the United States by a 1923 tune called "The Charleston" by composer/pianist James P. Johnson, which originated in the Broadway show Runnin' Wild and became one of the most popular hits of the decade. Runnin' Wild ran from 28 October 1923, through 28 June 1924. The peak year for the Charleston as a dance by the public was mid-1926 to 1927.

Origins 
While the dance probably came from the "star" or challenge dances that were all part of the African-American dance called Juba, the particular sequence of steps which appeared in Runnin' Wild were probably newly devised for popular appeal. "At first, the step started off with a simple twisting of the feet, to rhythm in a lazy sort of way. [This could well be the Jay-Bird.] When the dance hit Harlem, a new version was added. It became a fast kicking step, kicking the feet, both forward and backward and later done with a tap." Further changes were undoubtedly made before the dance was put on stage. In the words of Harold Courlander, while the Charleston had some characteristics of traditional Black American dance, it "was a synthetic creation, a newly-devised conglomerate tailored for widespread popular appeal." Although the step known as "Jay-Bird", and other specific movement sequences are of Afro-American origin, no record of the Charleston being performed on the plantation has been discovered.

Although it achieved popularity when the song "Charleston", sung by Elisabeth Welch, was added in the production Runnin' Wild, the dance itself was first introduced in Irving C. Miller's Liza in the spring of 1923.

Willie "The Lion" Smith noted that the dance was known well before that; in particular, he mentions the version done by Russell Brown under the name "Geechie dance".

The characteristic Charleston beat, which Johnson said he first heard from Charleston dockworkers, incorporates the clave rhythm and was considered by composer and critic Gunther Schuller to be synonymous with the Habanera, and the Spanish Tinge. Johnson actually recorded several "Charlestons," and in later years derided most of them as being of "that same damn beat." Several of these were recorded on player piano rolls, several of which have survived to this day.

The Charleston and similar dances such as the Black Bottom which involved "Kicking up your heels" were very popular in the later part of the 1920s. They became less popular after 1930, possibly because after seven years of being fashionable people simply became less interested. The new fashion for floor level sheath evening dresses was also probably a factor. The new dresses constricted the leg movements essential for the Charleston. There is a British Pathé Instructional Short from 1933 in which a new variation – the "Crawl Charleston" – is demonstrated by Santos Casini and Jean Mence. This shows a very sedate version of dance similar to a tango or waltz. It was not until dress hem lines rose toward the end of the thirties that the Charleston is again seen in film.

A slightly different form of Charleston became popular in the 1930s and 1940s, and is associated with Lindy Hop. In this later Charleston form, the hot jazz timing of the 20s Charleston was adapted to suit the swing jazz music of the 1930s and 1940s. This style of Charleston has many common names, though the most common are Lindy Charleston, Savoy Charleston, 30s or 40s Charleston and Swinging Charleston. In both the 20s Charleston and Swinging Charleston, the basic step takes eight counts and is danced either alone or with a partner.

Frankie Manning and other Savoy dancers saw themselves as doing Charleston steps within the Lindy rather than to be dancing Charleston.

Contemporary Charleston 

Today Charleston is an important dance in Lindy Hop dance culture, danced in many permutations: alone (solo), with a partner, or in groups of couples or solo dancers. The basic step allows for a vast range of variations and improvisation. Both the 20s and Swinging Charleston styles are popular today, though swinging Charleston is more commonly integrated into Lindy Hop dancing.

Solo 

Charleston can be danced solo, or with a partner. Its simple, flexible basic step makes it easy to concentrate on styling, improvisation and musicality.

Whichever style of Charleston one chooses, whether dancing alone, with a partner, or in groups, the basic step resembles the natural movement of walking, though it is usually performed in place. The arms swing forward and backwards, with the right arm coming forward as the left leg 'steps' forwards, and then moving back as the left arm and right leg begin their forward movement. Toes are not pointed, but feet usually form a right angle with the leg at the ankle. Arms are usually extended from the shoulder, either with straight lines, or more frequently with bent elbows and hands at right angles from the wrist (characteristics of many African dances). Styling varies with each Charleston type from this point.

Solo 20s Charleston 

Solo 20s Charleston gained popularity in the early 2000s, in many local Lindy Hop scenes around the world, prompted by competitions such as the Ultimate Lindy Hop Showdown (in 2005 and 2006 particularly) and workshops in the dance taught by high-profile dancers such as the Harlem Hot Shots (formerly known as The Rhythm Hot Shots) and a range of independent dancers.

Usually danced to hot jazz music recorded or composed in the 1920s, solo 20s Charleston is styled quite differently from the Charleston associated with the 1930s, 1940s and Lindy Hop, though they are structurally similar.

Solo 20s Charleston is usually danced to music at comparatively high tempos (usually above 200 or 250 beats per minute, with tempos above 300 BPM considered 'fast'), and is characterized by high-energy dancing. Faster movements are often contrasted with slower, dragging steps and improvisations.

As it is danced today, solo 20s Charleston often combines steps from several dances associated with the 1920s. The most valued form of solo 20s Charleston combines choreography with improvisation and creative variations on familiar dance steps. Above all, the most popular and most "successful" solo 20s Charleston dancers respond to the music in creative ways to express themselves.

Solo 20s Charleston is often danced in groups on the social dance floor or in formal choreography. Latterly, a derivative of the Charleston, known as the 'Chevin', has been witnessed in European dance halls. The origins of the Chevin are not known; however, some proponents suggest it is named after Elliott Chevin, a Serbian freedom fighter.

Solo 20s Charleston Competition 

Solo 20s Charleston competitions often make use of elements of the jam circle format, where individual competitors take turns dancing alone for the audience (usually for intervals of a phrase or number of phrases). Competitors move forwards to the audience out of an informal line, usually taking advantage of this movement to perform 'strolls' or other 'traveling' steps, taking the opportunity to "shine".

Despite the emphasis on solo dancing in these sorts of competitions, there is often much interaction between competitors and between the audience and competitors, frequently in the employment of comic devices (such as "silly walks" or impersonations) or showy and physically impressive "stunt" moves. This type of interaction is typical of the call and response of West African and Afro-American music and dance. In this call and response, audiences and fellow competitors encourage dancers with cheers, shouts, applause, physical gestures and other feedback.

This sort of competition structure is increasingly popular in Lindy Hop communities around the world, providing added challenges for dancers, new types of pleasure for audiences and emphasizing social dancing skills such as improvisation and musicality. This structure also echoes the cutting contests of jazz music which Ralph Ellison describes in his stories about live jazz music in the 1930s.

Partner Charleston 
Partner Charleston uses the basic step described above, though stylistic changes over the 1920s, 1930s and 1940s affected the styling, as well as ways of holding a partner. Traditionally partner Charleston was danced by a man and a woman, but now both men and women may dance with same gender.

20s Partner Charleston 
In the 20s Partner Charleston couples stand facing each other in a traditional European partner dancing pose, often referred to as closed position which aids leading and following. The leader's right hand is placed on the follower's back between their shoulder blades. The follower's left hand rests on the leader's shoulder or biceps. The leader's left hand and the follower's right hand are clasped palm to palm, held either at shoulder height or higher. Partners may maintain space between their bodies or dance with their torsos touching.

The basic step is for the leader to touch their left foot behind them, but not to shift their weight, on counts 1 and 2, while the follower mirrors the motion by touching their right foot in front of them without shifting weight. On counts 3 and 4, both partners bring their feet back to a standing position, but shift their weight onto the foot they have just moved. On counts 5 and 6, the leader touches their right foot in front of themselves while the follower touches their left foot back. On 7 and 8, both feet are brought back to the standing position where the necessary weight shift occurs to allow the basic step to repeat.

30s and 40s Partner Charleston 
30s and 40s Partner Charleston involves a number of positions, including "jockey position", where closed position is opened out so that both partners may face forward, without breaking apart.

In "side-by-side" Charleston partners open out the closed position entirely, so that their only points of connection are at their touching hips, and where the lead's right hand and arm touch the follower's back, and the follower's left hand and arm touch the leader's shoulder and arm. Both partners then swing their free arms as they would in solo Charleston. In both jockey and side-by-side Charleston the leader steps back onto their left foot, while the follower steps back onto their right.
In "tandem Charleston" one partner stands in front of the other (usually the follower, though the arrangement may vary), and both step back onto their left feet to begin. The partner behind holds the front partner's hands at their hip height, and their joined arms swing backwards and forwards as in the basic step.

There are numerous other variations on these holds, including "hand-to-hand" Charleston, and countless variations on the footwork (including Johnny's Drop, freezes, Savoy kicks and so on). Names for each vary in different local Lindy Hop scenes, though most have historic names associated with their creators or people in the community of the day. Aria Zapata and Teresa were the most famous dancers at the time.

Groups 
In swing dance or Lindy Hop communities today, both solo 20s Charleston and solo swinging Charleston are often danced in groups arranged in a loose circle on the social dance floor, in two long lines of facing dancers (evenly spaced) or in other formations in more strictly choreographed performances.

They may choose to follow steps 'called' either by a designated Caller or by each dancer in turn. In this called context, the group perform the same step for a phrase, or until the new step is "called". Individual dancers often improvise within the structure of the called step, bringing their own personal "flavor".

There are many local variations on this group dancing, including the following. One person will typically call out a variation (such as turning 360 degrees in place on counts 5–10), which is then done by everyone beginning the next measure and again for the following 2 measures. If the caller doesn't call another step immediately, the dancers return to the (default) basic step. Switching sides is sometimes called, upon which the dancers hop on the left foot across to the other side on counts 5–8, turning 180 degrees to the left.

In the more casual social group context, individual dancers may choose to dance "alone", improvising in response to the music or copying dancers around them.

Depictions in film 
 1925: Actress Bessie Love dances the Charleston in the film The King on Main Street.
 1926: In the film The Song and Dance Man Bessie Love performed the Charleston.
 1926: Santos Casani and Josie Lennard performed in a short film The Flat Charleston recorded in the DeForest Phonofilm sound-on-film system, and released in December 1926.
 1927: The 15 March 1927 film footage of Santos Casani and Josie Lennard dancing the Charleston on the roof of a London taxi was one of the era's notable publicity stunts. The film was shot by Pathé News at Kingsway in London.
 1927: Ruth Hanson and Rigmor S. Hanson performed in a short film The Flat Charleston, produced by Ruth and released in December 1927 in theaters in Reykjavík, Iceland.
 1927: Sur un air de Charleston, a short film made by Jean Renoir featuring Johnny Hudgins and Catherine Hessling.
 1946: The film It's a Wonderful Life features a Charleston contest that ends with the floor retracting and contestants falling into a swimming pool. The scene was filmed at the "Swim Gym" at Beverly Hills High School.
 1974: In the film The Great Gatsby, set in 1922, there were several parties with jazz bands and guests danced the Charleston.

References 
Notes

Bibliography

External links 
 
 

Ballroom dance
Swing dances
Articles containing video clips
Dance terminology
Novelty and fad dances